Metchie is a surname. Notable people with the surname include:
 John Metchie III (born 2000), Canadian gridiron football wide receiver
 Royce Metchie (born 1996), Canadian gridiron football defensive back